The Ooty Municipal Market is located in the Nilgiris district in Tamil Nadu. It is one of the largest retail markets in India. This market is the most important shopping centre in Ooty and utilized by the people for shopping  vegetables, fruits and groceries.

Features

The Ooty Municipal Market has been previously considered to be a model market of India. Events like Market shows were held in the market premises years ago. It features 1500 permanent sales outlets and 500 temporary outlets. The market is visited by 3,500 to 4,000 people on a typical weekday and between 4000 and 5000 people on weekends. During the summer tourist season in Ooty, the average number of visitors per day is more than 5000. It has 15 gates around the perimeters for access to visitors.

Congestion concerns
The market has had problems with increased congestion over the years. The market has not been able to cope with the increase in number of visitors.

See also
 Ooty bus stand
 Charring Cross, Ooty
 Commercial road, Ooty

References

Culture of Ooty
Retail markets in India